LPV is an acronym that may refer to:

Leaders Party of Vanuatu, a political party in Vanuatu
Limiting pressure velocity, a term relating to tribology (the study of friction and wear)
Localizer performance with vertical guidance, aviation
Logopedics Phoniatrics Vocology, a British Voice Association journal
Long-period variable star, astronomy
Low-pressure valve, plumbing
Lunar piloted vehicle, space exploration
Linear parameter varying, systems and control
Light Propagation Volumes, a method for computing Global Illumination in Computer graphics
Blue Origin LPV, the current ship registry name for the Blue Origin landing platform ship
Lycée Paul Valéry (disambiguation), which may refer to several French schools

See also

 "LPV/r" refers to the HIV drug Lopinavir/Ritonavir (trade names: Kaletra / Aluvia)

 LP5 (disambiguation)